Asgharabad (also Romanized as Aşgharābād; also known as Changā’ī-ye Aşgharābād) is a village in Koregah-e Gharbi Rural District, in the Central District of Khorramabad County, Lorestan Province, Iran. At the 2006 census, its population was 325, in 61 families.

References 

Towns and villages in Khorramabad County